The following article presents a summary of the 1984 football (soccer) season in Brazil, which was the 83rd season of competitive football in the country.

Campeonato Brasileiro Série A

Quarterfinals

|}

Semifinals

|}

Final

Fluminense declared as the Campeonato Brasileiro champions by aggregate score of 1-0.

Campeonato Brasileiro Série B

Quarterfinals

|}

Semifinals

|}

Final

Uberlândia declared as the Campeonato Brasileiro Série B champions by aggregate score of 1-0.

Promotion
The champion and the runner-up, which are Uberlândia and Remo, were promoted to the following year's first level.

State championship champions

Youth competition champions

Other competition champions

Brazilian clubs in international competitions

Brazil national team
The following table lists all the games played by the Brazil national football team in official competitions and friendly matches during 1984.

Women's football

Domestic competition champions

References

 Brazilian competitions at RSSSF
 1984 Brazil national team matches at RSSSF

 
Seasons in Brazilian football
Brazil